Sket Dance (stylized as SKET DANCE) is a Japanese manga series written and illustrated by Kenta Shinohara. The manga follows the adventures of the Sket-dan, a high school club whose goal it is to help the students and teachers of Kaimei High School with their problems, as they do whatever it takes to help make their campus a better place. The story is mainly told in the perspective of the Sket-dan'''s three members: Bossun, the leader of the group; Himeko, the "muscle" and the only female in the group; and Switch, the otaku and the "brains" of the group. It was serialized in Shueisha's shōnen manga magazine Weekly Shōnen Jump from July 2007 to July 2013, with its chapters collected in 32 tankōbon volumes.

The manga was adapted into an anime television series produced by Tatsunoko Production, and was broadcast on TV Tokyo from April 2011 to September 2012, airing 77 episodes. In 2009, Sket Dance won the 55th annual Shogakukan Manga Award in the shōnen category.

Synopsis

The club consists of three members: Bossun, the immature yet reliable "jack-of-all-trades" leader of the group; Himeko, the aggressive yet delicate "muscle" of the group who wields a hockey stick as her weapon; and Switch, the tech-savvy otaku and the "brains" of the group who only speaks through his laptop with speech synthesis software. Together as the Sket-dan, the trio take on requests from different kinds of individuals around their school, and no matter how big or small the request, no matter how mundane or absurd, the Sket-dan manage to always get the job done – all on a mission to improve the lives of the people in their high school.

Media
MangaSket Dance is written and illustrated by Kenta Shinohara. A one-shot chapter was published in the Winter 2006 issue of Shueisha's Akamaru Jump and another one-shot was published in Shueisha's Weekly Shōnen Jump on August 28, 2006. Sket Dance was later serialized for six years in Weekly Shōnen Jump from July 14, 2007, to July 8, 2013. Its 288 individual chapters were published in thirty-two tankōbon volumes published by Shueisha, released from November 2, 2007, to August 2, 2013.

Starting in 2018, Shueisha revealed plans to re-release Sket Dance into a 16-volume bunkoban edition release, which condenses two tankōbon volumes of the manga series into one supersized volume. The first two bunkoban volumes of Sket Dance were released on June 18, 2018. The final bunkoban volume was released on January 18, 2019, and the complete 16-volume box set was released on August 8, 2019.

Outside Japan, the series is licensed by Tong Li Publishing in Taiwan, by Kazé in France, by Elex Media Komputindo in Indonesia, and by Kim Đồng Publishing House in Vietnam.

Anime

In October 2010, an anime television series adaptation of Sket Dance was announced. Animated by Tatsunoko Production and directed by Keiichiro Kawaguchi, the series was broadcast for seventy-seven episodes on TV Tokyo from April 7, 2011, to September 27, 2012. 

The series has been published in numerous DVD volumes. The first DVD compilation of Sket Dance was released on August 28, 2011, with individual volumes being released monthly. As of May 24, 2013, 26 individual volumes have been released.

An original video animation (OVA) was released on February 4, 2013, bundled with the 29th volume of the manga.

In September 2021, in commemoration of the anime's 10th anniversary, it was announced that a Blu-ray box set, titled "Sket Dance Memorial Complete Blu-ray", is set to be released on December 24, 2021. It will include the seventy-seven episodes and the 2013 OVA.

On October 15, 2021, the first 25 episodes became available for streaming in Japan on Amazon Prime Video. Episodes 26 to 51 were made available on November 15, and episodes 52 to 77 were made available on December 15.

Drama CDs
Shueisha released two drama CD based on the manga series. The first drama CD is named Sket Dance ドラマCD, and was released on October 30, 2009. A second drama CD called Sket Dance 2 ドラマCD was released on April 28, 2010.

Light novels
SKET DANCE extra dance1: Theory true? Seven wonders of school
SKET DANCE extra dance2: Student Council Case Report ~The Cook Shell Incident~

Video games
Bossun, Himeko, and Switch appear together as a single support character in the Jump crossover fighting game J-Stars Victory VS.

Reception
From volume 6 onward, Sket Dance has consistently debuted on the weekly best sellers list for manga in Japan. Volume 6 debuted at number 9. Volumes 7, 9, and 10 debuted at number 11. Volume 8 debuted at number 13 while volume 11 debuted at number 12.

In January 2010, Sket Dance was announced as the winner of the 55th annual Shogakukan Manga Award for best shōnen manga.

In September 2009, Japanese publisher Shueisha issued an apology in the 42nd weekly issue of Weekly Shōnen Jump'' over a depiction of main characters, Bossun and Himeko, inhaling helium to raise the pitch of their voices. The scene drew criticism from online forums and blogs over the danger of suffocation from breathing helium.

References

External links
 Official Website 
 Sket Dance at TV Tokyo 
 

2006 manga
2009 Japanese novels
Anime series based on manga
Comedy anime and manga
Light novels
School life in anime and manga
Shōnen manga
Shueisha franchises
Shueisha manga
Slice of life anime and manga
Tatsunoko Production
TV Tokyo original programming
Winners of the Shogakukan Manga Award for shōnen manga
Japanese high school television series